The 1945 Stanley Cup Finals was a best-of-seven series between the Detroit Red Wings and the Toronto Maple Leafs. The Maple Leafs won the series four games to three, despite leading 3-0 in a situation similar to 1942.

Paths to the Finals
Toronto beat the defending champion Montreal Canadiens in six games to advance to the Finals. Detroit defeated the Boston Bruins in seven games to reach the Finals.

Game summaries
This was the first Stanley Cup Finals in NHL history where both teams started rookie goaltenders. Harry Lumley, who had become the youngest goaltender to play in the league the previous year, was in the Wings' net, while Frank McCool substituted for regular Maple Leafs netminder Turk Broda, who was in Europe with the Canadian army at the time.

In the first three games, which were low-scoring goaltenders' duels, McCool did not allow the Wings a single goal, the first time one team shut out the other for the first three games in Stanley Cup Finals history. In addition, Toronto now stood one win away from sweeping Detroit, as the Red Wings' Mud Bruneteau noted after game three. Fittingly enough, the Red Wings did the coming back this time, as their offense finally caught fire.

In game four, the Maple Leafs had a chance to win the Cup on Maple Leaf Gardens ice, but the Red Wings got on the board for the first time in the series when Flash Hollett opened the scoring 8:35 into the game, ending McCool's shutout streak at 193:09 (dating back to the semifinals against Montreal). Four other Detroit players, including rookie Ted Lindsay (who scored what transpired to be the game-winner at 3:20 of the third period), scored to overcome Ted Kennedy's hat trick.

Games five and six were Lumley's time to shine, shutting out the Leafs, including an overtime shutout in the sixth game, and extending the Finals. The series returned to Detroit for a seventh game, the Wings hoping to avenge their "choking" against the Leafs in 1942.

Game seven
Toronto coach Hap Day almost had to eat his words of a few years back when he said of the Leafs' 1942 comeback from being down 3–0 in games, "There will never be another experience like this." Babe Pratt, however, scored the winning goal in a 2–1 victory that saved the Maple Leafs from being the victim of a great comeback win by the Red Wings. Lumley left the ice almost immediately after the end of the game, but a Detroit Olympia crowd chant of "We want Lumley!" brought him back. Lumley would go on to a Hockey Hall of Fame career. and McCool played just 22 more games in the NHL, as Broda returned to the Leafs in January 1946.

This was the first time in the history of game seven of the Stanley Cup Finals that the home team lost.

Stanley Cup engraving
The 1945 Stanley Cup was presented to Maple Leafs captain Bob Davidson by NHL President Red Dutton following the Maple Leafs 2–1 win over the Red Wings in game seven.

The following Maple Leafs players and staff had their names engraved on the Stanley Cup

1944–45 Toronto Maple Leafs

See also
 1944–45 NHL season

Notes

References and notes

 Podnieks, Andrew; Hockey Hall of Fame (2004). Lord Stanley's Cup. Bolton, Ont.: Fenn Pub. pp 12, 50. 
 

Stanley Cup
Stanley Cup Finals
Detroit Red Wings games
Toronto Maple Leafs games
April 1945 sports events in the United States 
April 1945 sports events in Canada 
Ice hockey competitions in Detroit
Ice hockey competitions in Toronto
1945 in Detroit
1940s in Toronto
Stanley Cup
1945 in Ontario